On 21 May 2014, a Taiwanese man carried out a stabbing spree directed at random civilians on a Taipei Metro train near Jiangzicui Station, resulting in four deaths and 24 injuries. It was the first fatal attack on the city's subway system since operations began in 1996. The suspected attacker, Cheng Chieh, then 21, was arrested after the attack. He was sentenced to 144 years in prison and four death sentences, and was executed on 10 May 2016.

Attack
The attack started on 21 May 2014 at around 16:25 local time, inside a Bannan Line train heading west between Longshan Temple Station in Taipei and Jiangzicui Station in New Taipei. The distance between the two stations is the longest between any two stations in the Taipei metro system, lasting three to five minutes. During the attack, the assailant chased and hacked passengers with a 30 cm long fruit knife. Before the train could stop at Jiangzicui Station, a group of passengers banded together to distance themselves using umbrellas while others tried to discourage the attacker by loudly taunting him.

Victims
According to statistics compiled by the New Taipei Fire Department, the youngest victim was a 26-year-old graduate student at National Cheng Kung University, identified as Chang Cheng-han (male). The other three killed were 28-year-old Hsieh Ching-yun (male), 47-year-old Pan Pi-chu and 62-year-old Lee Tsui-yun (both female). They were all taken to different hospitals in Taipei and New Taipei, the department said. In addition, 24 others were wounded during the knife attack, 10 critically.

Perpetrator

Cheng Chieh was born on 3 April 1993, and attended schools in Taipei. He grew up with few friends, and was extremely focused on his studies. Cheng was also interested in violent online games and had written horror stories.

In elementary school, Cheng threatened to kill classmates over small disagreements. In junior high school, he had carried a knife for a month looking for a chance to stab his teacher. In high school, Cheng began blogging about his plans to kill and posted articles about murders. He enrolled in the Chung Cheng Institute of Technology in 2011 with the intention of receiving military training, but was expelled two years later. He then transferred to Tunghai University. School officials there had noticed Cheng's startling social media activity and offered him counseling before the incident, but no irregularities were discovered. At the time of the attack, Cheng lived in the Banqiao District of New Taipei with his parents and younger brother.

Aftermath
When the subway train arrived at Jiangzicui Station, a single suspected assailant was subdued by passengers, police and metro staff and taken to the nearby Haishan police station after a brief standoff. Taipei Mayor Hau Lung-pin said police presence on the metro was increased soon after the incident and added that he was requesting reinforcements from the National Police Agency.

On 22 May, the suspect was taken to the New Taipei District Prosecutors Office for questioning. A prosecutor applied to detain him in the New Taipei District Court, which was approved by a judge around 6:20 am. He was detained in the Taipei Detention Center located in Tucheng District, with an inmate number of 1892.

Trainset number 117/118, which was the setting of the stabbing attack, was temporarily withdrawn from service after arrival at Jiangzicui Station and underwent disinfection and change of seats. It was then renumbered 175/176 (173/174 was avoided as "" sounds like "", which literally means "kill together, die together") and returned to service in May 2015.

Questioning after attack
New Taipei Police Chief Chen Kuo-en identified the suspected attacker as Cheng Chieh, a 21-year-old second-year student at Tunghai University in the central city of Taichung. Chief Chen said the suspect told police he had wanted to do something "shocking and big" and had plotted to carry out the attack from childhood. Chen said no other motive was presently known.

During questioning, the suspect said he originally intended to attack after his college graduation, but decided to move earlier since he had "no classes" on 21 May and he had grown tired of living. The suspect stated that he does not admit guilt, feels no regret, wants the death sentence, and that even if his parents were on the train he attacked, he would have killed them, as well as the prosecutors questioning him.

Reactions

On the evening of 21 May, people began leaving flowers and cards at an exit of Jiangzicui Station to pay tribute to those who died in the attack.

On 22 May, President Ma Ying-jeou condemned the attack and ordered the National Police Agency to investigate what led a university student to stab four people to death on a crowded subway train. The Legislative Yuan on 23 May released a joint statement signed by all political parties calling for the National Police Agency to thoroughly re-examine and increase police deployment on metro systems, railways and airports. Taipei Mayor Hau Lung-bin announced that police officers from precincts in Taipei and New Taipei City are to be permanently deployed at each of the Taipei MRT commuter rail system's 109 stations.

General manager Tan Gwa-guang of the Taipei Rapid Transit Corporation stated that the company would pay the medical expenses of the victims and set aside NT$4 million to compensate their families. Taipei City Government also raised funds to use as compensation.

Tunghai University released an open letter, saying that Cheng is part of the family, and promised to set up an expert committee to investigate the matter.

Kuomintang legislator Chiang Huei-chen (江惠貞) said the passengers had put themselves in danger by focusing on their smartphones, while another KMT legislator, Lin Te-fu (林德福), said the passengers should have quickly pressed the emergency alert button in the train, and that the passengers lacked common sense. These remarks had sparked a public outcry against the legislators.

The incident has sparked a debate online about whether the death penalty is appropriate punishment for such attacks. A Facebook group named "Indefinitely supporting death penalty for Cheng Chieh" had over 32,000 "likes" as of 22 May 2014.

Lin Hsin-yi (林欣怡), executive director of the Taiwan Alliance to End the Death Penalty, said that the most important thing at present is for the public to think about how to help the victims of the metro slashing spree and ease the survivors and their relatives out of the suffering brought about by the tragedy.

On 27 May, Cheng Chieh's parents publicly apologized at Jiangzicui Station and called for a quick death sentence for their son.

Trial
Cheng was indicted by the New Taipei District Prosecutors Office on 21 July, and charged with four counts of murder and 22 counts of attempted murder. The prosecution was led by Chen Po-chun. The Taipei Rapid Transit Corporation, the company that runs the Taipei Metro, claimed that ridership was down by 945,000 within ten days of Cheng's actions, causing them to lose NT$20.61 million, an amount for which they sued Cheng.

Cheng was found guilty of four counts of murder and 22 counts of attempted murder on 6 March 2015 in the Taiwan New Taipei District Court. For each count of murder, he was sentenced to death and deprivation of citizen's rights for life; for each count of attempted murder, he was sentenced to a jail term of between five years, two months and eight years. His knife was also confiscated. On 7 August, the New Taipei District Court ordered Cheng to pay approximately NT$30 million to ten victims of the attack. His death sentence was appealed to the Taiwan High Court, which upheld the ruling. In a separate ruling on 7 January 2016, the High Court determined that Cheng owed another NT$61.39 million to victims and their families. In February 2016, Cheng was granted permission to attend the Supreme Court proceedings for his final appeal of the death sentence. Cheng became the first defendant subject to a death penalty to appear in front of the Supreme Court when his appeal was heard in April 2016. The court's final decision, to uphold all previous rulings, was issued on 22 April. Cheng's criminal penalties included a total of 144 years imprisonment and four death sentences.

Execution
Justice Minister Luo Ying-shay signed the execution order for Cheng at 17:00 on 10 May 2016. Cheng was executed at 20:47 on the same day. After eating his last meal, a biandang with stewed pork, rice and vegetables, Cheng was given general anesthesia. Soon after its administration, he was laid in a prone position and shot in the heart three times. The 18-day gap between Cheng's final guilty verdict and execution was the shortest in Taiwanese judicial history.

See also

 Osaka school massacre
 Akihabara massacre
 Shimonoseki Station massacre
 List of rampage killers in Asia
 Murder of Nia Wilson

References

Mass murder in 2014
Mass stabbings in Asia
Murder in Taiwan
2014 in Taiwan
Taipei Metro
Deaths by stabbing in Taiwan
2010s in Taipei
Stabbing attacks in 2014
Knife attacks
2014 crimes in Taiwan
2010s murders in Taiwan
2014 murders in Asia
Attacks on railway stations
Mass murder in Taiwan
May 2014 crimes in Asia